"And Then There Was Silence" is a song by German power metal band Blind Guardian. It was released in November 2001 as the lead single from their album A Night at the Opera.

Written by singer Hansi Kürsch and composed by Kürsch and guitarist André Olbrich, the song is based on The Iliad by Homer and on the Aeneid by Virgil, and narrates the final days of Troy, as foreseen by Cassandra, daughter of the king of the destroyed city who foresaw the event.

The song required as much production time as the rest of A Night at the Opera combined due to its length, intricacy, and number of audio tracks. At over 14 minutes, it is the longest track recorded by Blind Guardian. A new version was recorded in 2012 and included as part of the compilation album Memories of a Time to Come.

Track listing
 "And Then There Was Silence"  – 14:06
 "Harvest of Sorrow"  – 3:40	
 "Born in a Mourning Hall" (multimedia track) – 5:17

Personnel
 Hansi Kürsch – vocals and backing vocals
 André Olbrich – lead, rhythm and acoustic guitar
 Marcus Siepen – rhythm guitar
 Thomen Stauch – drums and percussion

Production
 Anry Nemo – cover art

Charts

Year-end charts

References

2001 singles
Blind Guardian songs
2001 songs
Virgin Records singles
Songs based on poems
Songs written by Hansi Kürsch
Songs written by André Olbrich
Works based on the Iliad
Works based on the Aeneid
Music based on works by Homer